KZTN-LD, virtual and UHF digital channel 20, is a low powered television station licensed to Boise, Idaho, United States. The station is owned by Celebration Praise, LLC.

History

In 2010, the former station's owners, Lopes Broadcasting, sold the station to Family Radio. The sale was approved by the FCC in September 2010.

On November 4, 2011, the then-KITL-LP flash cut to its digital signal, broadcasting its Family Radio television programming on DT1, and an audio only feed from KEAR-FM on DT2. On February 1, 2013, the station changed its call sign to KHFR-LD, and again on June 9, 2014 to the current KZTN-LD.

In 2015, Family Radio sold the station to Celebration Praise, LLC. The sale was consummated October 7, 2015.

Digital channels
The station's digital signal is multiplexed:

References

External links

ZTN-LD
Low-power television stations in the United States